Sejidae is a family of mites in the order Mesostigmata. The oldest known record of the group is an indeterminate deutonymph from the mid Cretaceous (Albian-Cenomanian) aged Burmese amber of Myanmar.

Species

Archaeopodella Athias-Henriot, 1977
 Archaeopodella scopulifera Athias-Henriot, 1977      
Asternolaelaps Berlese, 1923
 Asternolaelaps australis Womersley & Domrow, 1959      
 Asternolaelaps castrii Athias-Henriot, 1972      
 Asternolaelaps fecundus Berlese, 1923      
 Asternolaelaps nyhleni (Sellnick, 1953)      
 Asternolaelaps putriligneus Kaczmarek, 1984      
 Asternolaelaps querci Wisniewski & Hirschmann, 1984      
Epicroselus Berlese, 1904
 Epicroselus angellioides Berlese, 1904      
Ichthyostomatogaster Sellnick, 1953
 Ichthyostomatogaster nyhleni Sellnick, 1953      
Iphidinychus Berlese, 1913
 Iphidinychus balazyi Hirschmann & Wisniewski, in Hirschmann, Wisniewski & Hiramatsu 1992      
 Iphidinychus kakumeiensis Hiramatsu & Hirschmann, in Hirschmann, Wisniewski & Hiramatsu 1992      
 Iphidinychus manicatus (Berlese, 1913)      
Sejus C.L.Koch, 1836
 Sejus acanthurus Canestrini, 1884      
 Sejus armatus (Fox, 1947)      
 Sejus australis Hirschmann & Kaczmarek, in Hirschmann, Wisniewski & Kaczmarek 1991      
 Sejus bakeriarmatus Hirschmann, in Hirschmann, Wisniewski & Kaczmarek 1991      
 Sejus boliviensis Hirschmann & Kaczmarek, in Hirschmann, Wisniewski & Kaczmarek 1991      
 Sejus bugrovskii Wisniewski & Hirschmann, in Hirschmann, Wisniewski & Kaczmarek 1991      
 Sejus camerunis Wisniewski & Hirschmann, in Hirschmann, Wisniewski & Kaczmarek 1991      
 Sejus congoensis Wisniewski & Hirschmann, in Hirschmann, Wisniewski & Kaczmarek 1991      
 Sejus cubanus Wisniewski & Hirschmann, in Hirschmann, Wisniewski & Kaczmarek 1991      
 Sejus geometricus Hirschmann & Kaczmarek, in Hirschmann, Wisniewski & Kaczmarek 1991      
 Sejus hinangensis Hirschmann & Kaczmarek, in Hirschmann, Wisniewski & Kaczmarek 1991      
 Sejus indicus Bhattacharyya, 1978      
 Sejus italicus Berlese, 1916      
 Sejus javensis Hirschmann & Kaczmarek, in Hirschmann, Wisniewski & Kaczmarek 1991      
 Sejus klakahensis Hirschmann, in Hirschmann, Wisniewski & Kaczmarek 1991      
 Sejus krantzi Hirschmann, in Hirschmann, Wisniewski & Kaczmarek 1991      
 Sejus manualkranzi Hirschmann, in Hirschmann, Wisniewski & Kaczmarek 1991      
 Sejus marquesanus Hirschmann, in Hirschmann, Wisniewski & Kaczmarek 1991      
 Sejus mesoafricanus Wisniewski & Hirschmann, in Hirschmann, Wisniewski & Kaczmarek 1991      
 Sejus novaezealandiae Fain & Galloway, 1993      
 Sejus oblitus Hirschmann, in Hirschmann, Wisniewski & Kaczmarek 1991      
 Sejus polonicus Hirschmann & Kaczmarek, in Hirschmann, Wisniewski & Kaczmarek 1991      
 Sejus porosus (Domrow, 1957)      
 Sejus posnaniensis Hirschmann & Kaczmarek, in Hirschmann, Wisniewski & Kaczmarek 1991      
 Sejus rafalskii Wisniewski & Hirschmann, in Hirschmann, Wisniewski & Kaczmarek 1991      
 Sejus savannakhetianus Hirschmann & Kaczmarek, in Hirschmann, Wisniewski & Kaczmarek 1991      
 Sejus sejiformis   
 Sejus solaris Wisniewski & Hirschmann, in Hirschmann, Wisniewski & Kaczmarek 1991      
 Sejus stebaevi Wisniewski & Hirschmann, in Hirschmann, Wisniewski & Kaczmarek 1991      
 Sejus tanganicus Hirschmann & Kaczmarek, in Hirschmann, Wisniewski & Kaczmarek 1991      
 Sejus venezuelanus Hirschmann & Wisniewski, 1994      
 Sejus viduus C.L.Koch, 1839      
 Sejus vitzthumiangelioides Hirschmann, in Hirschmann, Wisniewski & Kaczmarek 1991      
 Sejus vitzthumiseurati Hirschmann, Wisniewski & Kaczmarek, 1991      
Uropodella Berlese, 1888
 Uropodella camini Hirschmann & Zirngiebl-Nicol, 1984      
 Uropodella congoensis Wisniewski & Hirschmann, 1991      
 Uropodella krantzi Hirschmann & Zirngiebl-Nicol, 1984      
 Uropodella laciniata Berlese, 1888      
Willmannia Balogh, 1938
 Willmannia sejiformis Balogh, 1938      
Zuluacarus Trägårdh, 1906
 Zuluacarus termitophilus Trägårdh, 1906

References

Mesostigmata
Acari families